is a 1998 video game developed by Koei. It is part of Koei's Historical Simulation Series of games, and is the sequel to Genghis Khan II: Clan of the Gray Wolf (which is actually the third game in the series). Unlike the previous games, IV was developed for very few platforms: Microsoft Windows and PlayStation.

Gameplay
The player is given the option to conquer either the country of Mongolia as Genghis Khan himself, or to play as a world leader and take over the known world of the time. The game is turn-based, and very similar to the Romance of the Three Kingdoms series in that everything is done with generals, and managing them is an important part of the game. Unlike Genghis Khan II, in this game the player has absolute control over everything; for example, previously, unless the king was in a given territory, he could not directly control it. The game also includes a turn-based battle sequence, allowing specific control to the player or delegated to a general. Unlike the previous Series, players can use any countries.

Scenario
Scenario 1 AD1189 "The Gray Wolf Riding in Prairie."
 Main Characters(Which countries controlled by player have default plots at the game start) - Objective
 Mongol with Genghis Khan - Defeat Jadaran and Keraites
 France with Philip II - Defeat England
 Kamakura Regime (will change to Kamakura Shogunate after conquest Hiraizumi Regime) with Minamoto no Yoritomo - Defeat Hiraizumi Regime
 Byzantine Empire with Isaac II - Defeat Republic of Venice
Scenario 2 AD1271 "The Descendants of Gray Wolf."
 Main Characters
 Yuan dynasty with Kublai Khan - Defeat Southern Song dynasty
 Southern Song dynasty with Duzong - Defeat Yuan dynasty
 Kamakura Shogunate with Hōjō Tokimune - Capture 1 of any Eurasia cities
 England with Henry III - Defeat France
Scenario 3 AD1229 "The Roaring of the Wolves" (Added in PUK Version)
 Main Characters
 Mongol Empire with Ögedei Khan - Defeat Jin dynasty
 Jin dynasty with Aizong - Defeat Mongol Empire
 France with Louis IX - Capture any cities
 Holy Roman Empire with Frederick II - Capture any Islamic cities
 ***Any Countries which near and bad relationship with Mongol Empire will have a Plot that Mingburnu want to join you to revenge the Mongols.
Scenario 4 AD1370 "The Wolf Appear in Western Regions" (Added in PUK Version)
 Main Characters
 Timurid Empire with Timur - Defeat Kipchak Khanate
 Ming dynasty with Zhu Yuanzhang - Defeat Yuan dynasty
 Byzantine Empire with John V - Defeat Ottoman Turks
 France with Charles V - Defeat England
 ***England will have a plot and get Garter Knights (Unique units which Stronger than Knight) after the few turns. (Even controlled by Player or Computer)

Generals statistic
The most Politics point: Yelü Chucai 100 Points
The most War Ability point: Timur 98 Points (Can be 100 when the player finish the default plot - defeat Kipchak Khanate)
The most Intelligence point: Frederick II 100 Points
The most statistic points: Philip II (94 Points of Politics, 90 Points of War Ability, 98 Points of Intelligence |  Total: 282 Points)
Have all Politics skills: Yelü Chucai
Have all War skills: Timur

1998 video games
Genghis Khan video games
Japan-exclusive video games
Koei games
PlayStation (console) games
Turn-based strategy video games
Video game sequels
Video games developed in Japan
Video games set in feudal Japan
Video games set in medieval England
War video games set in Asia
War video games set in Europe
Windows games
Multiplayer and single-player video games